Delmont is an unincorporated community in Fairfield County, in the U.S. state of Ohio.

History
Delmont was a station on the Cincinnati and Muskingum Valley Railroad. A post office was established at Delmont in 1888, and remained in operation until 1905.

References

Unincorporated communities in Fairfield County, Ohio
Unincorporated communities in Ohio